Woodbridge Center is a major two-level shopping mall located in Woodbridge Township, New Jersey at the intersection of U.S. Route 1 and U.S. Route 9.
As of 2022, the mall currently features Macy's, Boscov's, J. C. Penney, and Dick's Sporting Goods, the mall currently features notable brands, Garage, Hollister, Ardene, G by Guess, and Cotton On.

The land that Woodbridge Center now stands on used to be the location of Maple Hill Dairy farm and the old clay pits in Woodbridge. The mall is owned and managed by JLL (company) (Jones Lang LaSalle Inc.).  The mall features a fountain, carousel, train ride, and children's play area. Although most malls have a food court, Woodbridge Center's eating establishments are spread throughout the mall with their own individual seating areas and restrooms. Before the coming of the food court, all malls had their eating establishments spread throughout the mall.

The mall's location near Staten Island and the benefit of no sales tax on clothes in New Jersey makes this mall, along with nearby Menlo Park Mall in Edison, a popular choice for New York shoppers. It is the 34th largest in the United States.

Lord & Taylor in addition to Sears closed in 2019.
SeaQuest Interactive Aquariums opened a large space, its first in New Jersey, on Thanksgiving 2019.

Mall history
The mall was developed by the Rouse Company and opened in 1971 with Abraham & Straus, Ohrbach's, and Stern's. In 1978, the mall was expanded with a new wing to include Hahne's. In 1981, J. C. Penney moved from the nearby Menlo Park Mall in Edison, New Jersey.  By 1987, the mall got a fresh new look through renovation. The stairwell in the A&S wing next to center court was removed, new flooring was added, new lighting was added, the mall entrances were redone, and the fountains in front of A&S were either changed (the 2nd floor fountain) or removed (the first floor fountains). The Mall's current fountain is on the 1st floor outside of Macy's. (The fountains in front of Lord & Taylor and Sears have been disabled.) In 2003, the mall was expanded with a new  Galyan's, the chain's first location in New Jersey, which become Dick's Sporting Goods in 2004. Notable department stores that have closed include Hahne's (became Fortunoff now Boscov's), Ohrbach's (which became Steinbach and later Lord & Taylor), Stern's (now Macy's), and A&S (later Sears).

In October 2007, the carousel ride was relocated near the J. C. Penney.  The train ride was also reconfigured to ensure both rides stay together at the same location. A toddler's play area, "Tiny Town", is located near the carousel and train rides.

On November 14, 2017, Dave & Buster's opened on the upper level by Sears, their first location in New Jersey.

On October 15, 2019, it was announced that Lord & Taylor would be closing.

On February 4, 2020, it was announced that Sears would also be closing during a series of closures.

Incidents
On March 8, 2012, police shot and killed a shoplifter in the Sears wing who had held a woman hostage.

See also
List of neighborhoods in Woodbridge Township, New Jersey
List of neighborhoods in Edison, New Jersey

References

External links

Official website

Woodbridge Township, New Jersey
Shopping malls in New Jersey
Shopping malls established in 1971
Buildings and structures in Middlesex County, New Jersey
Tourist attractions in Middlesex County, New Jersey
Shopping malls in the New York metropolitan area
Neighborhoods in Woodbridge Township, New Jersey